Bharalumukh is a locality near south bank of river Brahmaputra in Guwahati surrounded by Santipur and Pan Bazaar localities.

See also
 Paltan Bazaar
 Beltola

References

Neighbourhoods in Guwahati